A pillow is a cushion for the head.

Pillow may also refer to:

Places
Pillow, Pennsylvania, United States
Pillow Creek, British Columbia, Canada
Pillow Knob, Queen Elizabeth Land, Antarctica
Pillow Ridge, a volcanic ridge in British Columbia, Canada
Pillow Rock, near South Georgia Island, South Atlantic Ocean

People
Frank Pillow (born 1965), American former National Football League wide receiver
Gideon Johnson Pillow (1806–1878), American Civil War Confederate general, lawyer and politician
Ray Pillow (born 1937), American country music singer
Pillow (bodybuilder), American retired bodybuilder and exotic dancer Theresa Bell (born 1956)

Music

Groups
Pillow, a French band
The Pillows, a Japanese band

Songs
"My Pillow", from The Best of Roger Miller, Volume One: Country Tunesmith by Roger Miller
"Pillow", from Dogman by King's X
"Pillow", from Expectations by Bebe Rexha
"Pillow", from Homesongs by Adem Ilhan
"The Pillow", from Geffery Morgan by UB40

Other music
 Tears on My Pillow (disambiguation)

Other uses
Pillow, successor project to the Python Imaging Library (PIL)

See also
The Pillow Book, Japanese book completed in the year 1002
The Pillow Book (film), is a 1996 film, written and directed by Peter Greenaway
 The "Pillow symbol", is a name used in the travel industry for the  square lozenge
Pillow Academy, an independent, co-educational college preparatory school in unincorporated Leflore County, Mississippi
Pillow Flying Artillery, a Confederate artillery battery in the American Civil War
Pillow Featherbed, a Lalaloopsy character